Runa Konomi (born 6 August 2000) is a Japanese professional footballer who plays as a goalkeeper for WE League club Sanfrecce Hiroshima Regina.

Club career 
Konomi made her WE League debut on 12 September 2021.

References 

Living people
2000 births
Japanese women's footballers
Women's association football goalkeepers
Association football people from Fukuoka Prefecture
Sanfrecce Hiroshima Regina players
WE League players